{{DISPLAYTITLE:Tau2 Arietis}}

Tau2 Arietis, Latinized from τ2 Arietis, is the Bayer designation for a binary star in the northern constellation on Aries. The combined apparent visual magnitude of this system is +5.09, which is bright enough to be seen with the naked eye. At this distance the brightness of the star is diminished by 0.18 in magnitude because of extinction from interstellar gas and dust.

The primary component is an evolved giant star with a stellar classification of K3 III. It has expanded to 19 times the radius of the Sun, from which it is radiating 120 times the Sun's luminosity. This energy is being emitted into outer space from the outer atmosphere at an effective temperature of 4,406 K, giving it the cool orange glow of a K-type star. At an angular separation of 0.53 arcseconds is a magnitude 8.50 companion.

References

External links
Aladin previewer
Aladin sky atlas
 HR 1015

Arietis, 63
020893
015737
Arietis, Tau2
Aries (constellation)
K-type giants
1015
Durchmusterung objects